Zeng Fengnian (1809-1885) was a late Qing military figure from Jieshi, Lufeng, Guangdong. In 1845 he was appointed commander of the Nan'ao Subdistrict and in 1863 was given the peacock plume for his successful suppression of local bandits.

Biography 
Zeng joined the army young, and served in the Guangdong Xiangshan Association Division, the guerrilla army Yangjiang town in Guangdong and as the Governor of Guangdong among others.

In 1844, he was guaranteed by Viceroy of Min-Zhe and was sent under imperial decree to command the Nan'ao subdistrict garrison. Following his filial mourning, he came back in 1849 as the commander of Jieshi, Lufeng.

In 1853, Xianfeng Emperor approached Zeng to suppress the Nian Rebellion in Shandong, appointing him as the commander of the Dengzhou Town garrison. By 1861, he was able to suppress the local rebels and in the same year, applied for resignation in favor of taking care of his family. But his resignation was not granted and he had to remain in the garrison.

In 1863 Zeng was once again summoned by the Imperial Army in Zichuan District, Shandong and successfully suppressed the rebels in the area. For his suppression efforts, he was bestowed the peacock plume in June. He went back to his hometown and died of old age in home.

References 

1809 births
1885 deaths
Qing dynasty generals
People from Lufeng
Generals from Guangdong